Lydeard House in Bishops Lydeard, Somerset, England was built in the mid 18th century. It is a Grade II* listed building.

History

Lydeard House was built in the mid 18th century. It has been enlarged several times.

Architecture

The red sandstone building has limestone dressings and a slate roof. The main block has five bays with the stables set back from the main house and were only joined in the mid 19th century.

The gardens have been restored since 1999 including the dredging of the lake and erection of pergolas. The gardens are now open to the public occasionally as part of the National Gardens Scheme.

A raised garden at the rear of the house is enclosed by a Hindu-Moorish style red sandstone wall. The other walls and gate piers are also of red sandstone.

References

Grade II* listed buildings in Taunton Deane